Nothobranchius taiti is a species of brightly coloured seasonal killifish in the family Nothobranchiidae. It is endemic to Uganda. It is known from temporary pools and swamps formed on the seasonal floodplains of Apapi River system. The Apapi River is part of the Lake Kyoga basin in the upper Nile drainage in eastern Uganda.

Sources

Links
 Nothobranchius taiti on WildNothos

taiti
Fish described in 2019
Fish of Uganda
Endemic fauna of Uganda